Ravenscry is an alternative metal band from Italy.

History 

The project began in August 2008, near Milan, by a meeting between Paul Raimondi (guitar), Fagio (bass) and Simon Carminati (drums). Soon after, Mauro Paganelli (guitar) joined the band.

A few months later, Giulia Stefani joined the band as vocalist.

On 21 December 2009 the band released their first, self-titled EP, which is being sold through their official website, iTunes and Amazon. It contains five tracks: Nobody, Calliope, and a suite called Redemption.

On 1 October 2010 Ravenscry signed with Wormholedeath/Dreamcell11 to publish their first album named One Way Out, which was released on 15 April 2011.

The album, The Invisible, was released on 24 February 2017.

100 was released on 15 May 2020, during the COVID-19 pandemic.

Discography 

 Ravenscry (EP) - 21 December 2009
 One Way Out (LP) - 15 April 2011
 The Attraction of Opposites - 27 May 2014
 The Invisible - 24 February 2017
 100 - 15 May 2020

Members 

 Giulia Stefani (vocals)
 Paul Raimondi (guitar)
 Mauro Paganelli (guitar)
 Fagio (bass)
 Simon Carminati (drums)

References 

 Ravenscry Official Website

External links 

 Ravenscry Official Website
 Ravenscry | Listen and Stream Free Music, Albums, New Releases, Photos, Videos
 Ravenscry

Italian gothic metal musical groups
Alternative metal musical groups
Musical quintets
Musical groups from Milan